The Dallas Cowboys Ring of Honor (RoH) is a ring that formerly existed around Texas Stadium in Irving, Texas and currently around AT&T Stadium in Arlington, Texas, which honors former players, coaches and club officials who made outstanding contributions to the Dallas Cowboys football organization. In 1993, Jerry Jones said the Ring of Honor "stands for the men who built this franchise and had it called America's team" 

The Ring of Honor was created by Tex Schramm and began on November 23, 1975, which was designated in Dallas as Bob Lilly Day. On that day, the team held the first Cowboys reunion and unveiled Lilly's name and jersey number (74) beneath the press box during half time. As the first honoree, Lilly (who had retired from the NFL in July of '75 after 14 years) donned his Cowboy uniform once more and graciously accepted the honor, along with numerous other gifts, which included a car, a gun and a hunting dog. Also present at the event were Cowboys owner Clint Murchison, president/general manager Tex Schramm and Head Coach Tom Landry. As the first inductee, Lilly has the distinction of returning to present each new member into the RoH. Only nine players received the honor during the first three decades of the Cowboys existence, making the RoH a coveted achievement, true to the dream envisioned by Schramm, who became the 12th person selected to the Ring of Honor; the award was given posthumously in October 2003, a few months after he died. 
 

In 2005, three former Cowboys all-stars were simultaneously inducted during half time ceremonies on Monday Night Football. Troy Aikman, Emmitt Smith, and Michael Irvin, known as "The Triplets", were part of the 1990s Three-Time Super Bowl Championship Cowboys team.

Ring of Honor inductees have been chosen by the former president-general manager, Tex Schramm and then by owner Jerry Jones. Schramm set a precedent by placing a high value on the character of the inductees. There was controversy over the selection of Michael Irvin due to his drug charges.

In 2017, the Ring of Honor was extended when the walkway was built with the former players' numbers in front of Ford Center, Cowboys' indoor practice facility.

On November 1, 2015 Darren Woodson became the 21st member of the Dallas Cowboys Ring of Honor. 

On November 29, 2018, Gil Brandt became the 22nd member of the Dallas Cowboys Ring of Honor.

In total, the Dallas Cowboys Ring of Honor includes 19 players, 2 executives, and 1 head coach.

Inductees

References

Dallas Cowboys
American football museums and halls of fame
Halls of fame in Texas
Awards established in 1975
1975 in sports in Texas